Flanner House Homes is a national historic district located at Indianapolis, Indiana.  The district encompasses 180 contributing buildings in the Project Area "A" (Indianapolis Redevelopment Commission) of Indianapolis. It was developed between about 1950 and 1959, and include single family and duplex dwellings for African-American families. Notable buildings include the Revival Temple Church (c. 1910).

It was listed on the National Register of Historic Places in 2003.

See also
Lionel Artis

References

External links

Historic districts on the National Register of Historic Places in Indiana
Historic districts in Indianapolis
National Register of Historic Places in Indianapolis
African-American history of Indianapolis